Let's Be Friends is a 1969 album by Elvis Presley.

"Let's Be Friends" can also refer to:

 Let's Be Friends (film), a 2005 French film
 Let's Be Friends and Slay the Dragon Together, a 2008 album by Suburban Legends, commonly referred to as Let's Be Friends
 "Let's Be Friends", a 2010 song by Emily Osment from Fight or Flight
 "Let's Be Friends" (Carly Rae Jepsen song), a 2020 song by Carly Rae Jepsen